Bhitarkanika Mangroves  is a mangrove wetland in Odisha, India, covering an area of  in the Brahmani River and Baitarani River deltas.

History 
The Bhitarkanika Mangroves were zamindari forests until 1952, when the government of Odisha abolished the zamindari system, and put the zamindari forests in the control of the state forest department. The Gahirmatha Marine Wildlife Sanctuary, which bounds the Bhitarkanika Wildlife Sanctuary to the east, was created in September 1997, and encompasses Gahirmatha Beach and an adjacent portion of the Bay of Bengal. Bhitarkanika Mangroves were designated a Ramsar Wetland of International Importance in 2002.

Flora and fauna

About 62 mangrove species occur in the Bhitarkanika Mangroves, including Avicenna, Bruguiera, Heritiera and Rhizophora. Reptiles present in the mangroves include saltwater crocodile, king cobra, Indian python and water monitor. Between August 2004 and December 2006, 263 bird species were recorded, encompassing 147 resident and 99 migrant species.

Olive ridley turtles arrive in January to March for nesting at Gahirmatha Beach. An average of 240,000 nests per season was estimated between 1976 and 1996. Up to 80,000 individuals were captured every year until 1982. Since 1983, collecting and marketing turtles and their eggs is banned.

References

External links
 Bhitarkanika.org 
 Mangroves of Orissa (Orissa State Forest Department: Wildlife Organisation)
 Bhitarkanika Trip report - Wildlife Times
 Bhitarakanika : Tourists Place in Odisha
 YouTube Video

Mangrove ecoregions
Ecoregions of India
Environment of Odisha
Forests of Odisha
Forests of India
Wildlife sanctuaries in Odisha
Western Indo-Pacific
Wetlands of India
Ramsar sites in India
Indomalayan ecoregions
Tourism in Odisha